"Loving Up a Storm" is a song written by Johnny Slate and Danny Morrison, and recorded by American country music artist Razzy Bailey.  It was released in August 1980 as the third single from the album Razzy.  The song was Bailey's seventh country hit and the first of his five number ones.  "Loving up a Storm" went to number one for one week and spent a total of ten weeks on the country chart.

Charts

References

1980 singles
Razzy Bailey songs
Song recordings produced by Bob Montgomery (songwriter)
RCA Records singles
Songs written by Danny Morrison (songwriter)
Songs written by Johnny Slate
1980 songs